Wark is a surname. Notable people with the surname include:

Amanda Benoit-Wark (born 1976), Canadian ice hockey player
Betty Lou Wark (1937–2011), Canadian activist
Blair Wark (1894–1941), Australian soldier
Colin Wark (1896–1939), British composer
David Wark (1804–1905), Canadian senator
David Wark (Australian politician) (c. 1807–1862), Australian politician and doctor
David Wark Griffith (1875–1948), American film director
Doug Wark (born 1951), Scottish-American soccer player
Ian Wark (1899–1985), Australian chemist
Joe Wark (1947–2015), Canadian footballer
John Wark (born 1957), Scottish footballer
John Wark, Lord Wark (1877–1943), Scottish judge
Ken Wark (born 1961), Australian field hockey player
Kirsty Wark (born 1955), Scottish journalist
McKenzie Wark (born 1961), Australian writer
Sarah Wark (born 1986), Canadian curler
Shelley Wark-Martyn (born 1963), Canadian politician
Stuart Wark (born 1989), Scottish-Malaysian footballer
Robert R. Wark (1924–2007), Canadian art historian
Tom Wark, American wine critic
Wesley Wark (born 1952), Canadian historian

See also
Wark (disambiguation)